Josef Böck (22 June 1913 – 6 May 1999) was a German wrestler. He competed in the men's freestyle featherweight at the 1936 Summer Olympics.

References

External links
 

1913 births
1999 deaths
German male sport wrestlers
Olympic wrestlers of Germany
Wrestlers at the 1936 Summer Olympics
Sportspeople from Munich